Cheikhei (English: Full Stop) is a 2015 Indian Meitei language film directed by Premkumar Paonam and produced by Taibi, under the banner of Triveni Films and presented by Premila. It stars Gurumayum Bonny, Bala Hijam, Suranjit and Artina Thoudam in the lead roles. The story of the film was written by Premkumar Paonam. A.K. Yangoi composed the soundtrack for the film and Niranjan Usham wrote the lyrics.

Cheikhei was released at MSFDS on 13 December 2015.

Cast
 Gurumayum Bonny as Khamba
 Bala Hijam as Sanatombi
 Suranjit as Mani
 Artina Thoudam
 Heisnam Ongbi Indu as Khamba's mother
 Idhou
 Tayenjam Mema as Sanatombi's mother
 Hijam Shyamdhani
 Surjit Saikhom
 Ibomcha
 Jenny

Awards 
Manipur State Film Festival 2016
 Best Child Artist: Leishangthem Debika

References

External links

2010s Meitei-language films
2015 films